Mark Adrian Stewart (born 16 August 1979) is an Australian Liberal National politician who was the member of the Legislative Assembly of Queensland for Sunnybank from 2012 to 2015.

References

Liberal National Party of Queensland politicians
1979 births
Living people
Members of the Queensland Legislative Assembly
21st-century Australian politicians